Tata Steel Limited is an Indian multinational steel-making company, based in Jamshedpur, Jharkhand and headquartered in Mumbai, Maharashtra. It is a part of the Tata Group.

Formerly known as Tata Iron and Steel Company Limited (TISCO), Tata Steel is among the top steel producing companies in the world with an annual crude steel capacity of 34 million tonnes. It is one of the world's most geographically diversified steel producers, with operations and commercial presence across the world. The group (excluding SEA operations) recorded a consolidated turnover of US$19.7 billion in the financial year ending 31 March 2020. It is the second largest steel company in India (measured by domestic production) with an annual capacity of 13 million tonnes after Steel Authority of India Ltd. (SAIL). TATA Steel, along with SAIL and Jindal Steel and Power, are the only 3 Indian steel companies that have captive iron-ore mines, which gives the three companies price advantages.

The Key Managerial Personnel (KMP) at Tata Steel Limited India are Koushik Chatterjee as CFO (KMP) and Parvatheesam Kanchinadham as Company Secretary. Koushik Chatterjee, Mallika Srinivasan, Chandrasekaran Natarajan and 7 other members are presently associated as directors.

Tata Steel operates in 26 countries with key operations in India, Netherlands and the United Kingdom, and employs around 80,500 people. Its largest plant (10 MTPA capacity) is located in Jamshedpur, Jharkhand. In 2007, Tata Steel acquired the UK-based steel maker Corus. It was ranked 486th in the 2014 Fortune Global 500 ranking of the world's biggest corporations. It was the seventh most valuable Indian brand of 2013 according to Brand Finance.

In July 2019 Tata Steel Kalinganagar (TSK) was included in the list of the World Economic Forum's (WEF) Global Lighthouse Network.

Tata Steel has been recognised amongst India's Best Workplaces in Manufacturing 2022 by Great Place to Work. This recognition has been received for the fifth time, highlights the company's sustained focus on fostering a culture of high-trust, integrity, growth, and care for the employees. Tata Steel has also been inclusive towards its LGBTQ employees and also provides health insurance benefits for partners of its LGBTQ employees under the new HR policy.

History 

Tata Iron and Steel Company (TISCO) was founded by Jamsetji Nusserwanji Tata and established by Sir Dorabji Tata on 26 August 1907. TISCO started pig iron production in 1911 and began producing steel in 1912 as a branch of Jamsetji's Tata Group. The first steel ingot was manufactured on 16 February 1912. During the First World War (1914–1918), the company made rapid progress.

In 1920, The Tata Iron & Steel Company also incorporated The Tinplate Company of India Ltd (TCIL), as a joint venture with then Burmah Shell to manufacture Tinplate. TCIL is now Tata Tinplate and holds 70% market share in India.

By 1939, it operated the largest steel plant in the British Empire. The company launched a major modernisation and expansion program in 1951. Later, in 1958, the program was upgraded to 2 million metric tonnes per annum (MTPA) project. By 1970, the company employed around 40,000 people at Jamshedpur, and a further 20,000 in the neighbouring coal mines.

In November 2021, Tata Steel was the most profitable company in the Tata Group.

Nationalisation attempts 
There were two attempts one in 1971 and another in 1979, nationalise the company. Both were unsuccessful attempts. In 1971 Indira Gandhi regime tried to nationalise the company, but failed. In 1979 Janata Party regime (1977–79), wanted to nationalise TISCO (now Tata Steel). Then Minister for Industries George Fernandes, at the instigation of Biju Patnaik, Minister for Steel threatened nationalisation, but due to the unions protests the move failed.

In 1990, the company began to expand, and established its subsidiary, Tata Inc., in New York. The company changed its name from TISCO to Tata Steel Ltd. in 2005.

Expansions

Acquisitions 
NatSteel in 2004: Tata Steel agreed to acquire the steel making operations of the Singapore-based NatSteel for $486.4 million in cash. NatSteel had ended 2003 with turnover of $1.4 billion and a profit before tax of $47 million. The steel businesses of NatSteel would be run by the company through a wholly owned subsidiary called Natsteel Asia Pte Ltd. The acquisition was completed in February 2005. At the time of acquisition, NatSteel had a capacity of about 2 million tonnes per annum of finished steel.

Millennium Steel in 2005: Tata Steel acquired a majority stake in the Thailand-based steelmaker Millennium Steel for a total cost of $130 million. It paid US$73 million to Siam Cement for a 40% stake and offered to pay 1.13 baht per share for another 25% of the shares of other shareholders. Millennium Steel has now been renamed to Tata Steel Thailand and is headquartered in Bangkok. On 31 March 2013, it held approx. 68% shares in the acquired company.

Corus in 2006: Tata Steel signed a deal with Anglo-Dutch company, Corus to buy 100% stake at £4.3 billion ($8.1 billion) at 455 pence per share. On 19 November 2006, the Brazilian steel company Companhia Siderúrgica Nacional (CSN) launched a counter offer for Corus at 475 pence per share, valuing it at £4.5 billion. On 11 December 2006, Tata pre-emptively upped its offer to 500 pence per share, which was within hours trumped by CSN's offer of 515 pence per share, valuing the deal at £4.9 billion. The Corus board promptly recommended both the revised offers to its shareholders. On 31 January 2007, Tata Steel won their bid for Corus after offering 608 pence per share, valuing Corus at £6.7 billion ($12 billion). In 2005, Corus employed around 47,300 people worldwide, including 24,000 in the UK. At the time of acquisition, Corus was four times larger than Tata Steel, in terms of annual steel production. Corus was the world's 9th largest producer of Steel, whereas Tata Steel was at 56th position. The acquisition made Tata Steel world's 5th largest producer of Steel.

Tayo Rolls in 2008, formerly Tata-Yodogawa Limited is a metal fabrication and processing company headquartered in Jamshedpur, India. It was founded in 1968 as a joint venture between Tata Steel and the Japan-based Yodogawa Steels. In 2008, the company made the rights issue which was subscribed for only about 50% of its total value – Rs 60-crore. Due to undersubscription, the promoters acquired them, as result Tayo Rolls became a Tata Steel Subsidiary. Tata Steel owns 55.24% of the Tayo Rolls.

Steel Engineering and Vinausteel in 2007: Tata Steel through its wholly owned Singapore subsidiary, NatSteel Asia Pte Ltd, acquired controlling stake in both rolling mill companies located in Vietnam: Structure Steel Engineering Pte Ltd (100% stake) and Vinausteel Ltd (70% stake). The enterprise value for the acquisition was $41 million. With this acquisition, Tata Steel got hold of two rolling mills, a 250,000 tonnes per year bar/wire rod mill operated by SSE Steel Ltd. and a 180,000 tonnes per year reinforcing bar mill operated by Vinausteel Ltd.

Bhushan Steel in 2018: Tata Steel acquired the entire company in 2017–18, when Insolvency proceedings were initiated against the former company on 26 July 2017 under IBC. Tata steel emerged as the highest bidder and took over the company through its wholly owned subsidiary Bamnipal Steel Ltd. The company was renamed as Tata Steel BSL. Later in 2021 Tata Steel amalgamated Bamnipal Steel Ltd. and Tata Steel BSL thereby the latter became a direct subsidiary of Tata Steel (72.65%).

Nilachala Ispat Nigam Ltd in 2022: Tata Steel through its wholly owned subsidiary, Tata Steel Long Products (TSLP), acquired controlling stake in NINL.

Joint Ventures 
In 2006, Tata Steel and BlueScope Steel launched Tata BlueScope Steel Ltd, a joint venture for the manufacturing pre-engineered steel products.

In 2014, Tata Steel launched Jamshedpur Continuous Annealing and Processing Company Pvt Ltd (JCAPCPL), a joint venture with Nippon Steel to produce continuous annealed products intended for the automotive industry. The plant had a capacity of 600,000 tonnes and was setup with an investment of 2,750 Crores. Tata Steel held 51% of the joint venture.

Amalgamation
In 2022, Tata group moved for the amalgamation of seven metal companies of the group into Tata Steel. Seven metal companies of Tata group that will be merged with Tata Steel are Tata Steel Long Products Limited (TSLP), The Tinplate Company of India Limited (TCIL), Tata Metaliks Limited (TML), TRF Limited, The Indian Steel & Wire Products Limited (ISWPL), Tata Steel Mining Limited (TSML) and S & T Mining Company Limited.

Sports 

Tata Steel have traditionally played a key role in development of sports in India. They have been involved in the inception of Tata Football Academy, TSAF Climbing Academy, Tata Archery Academy, Naval Tata Hockey Academy - Jamshedpur and Odisha Naval Tata Hockey High Performance Centre.

Operations 

Tata Steel is headquartered in Mumbai, Maharashtra, India and has its marketing headquarters at the Tata Centre in Kolkata, West Bengal. It has a presence in around 50 countries with manufacturing operations in 26 countries including: India, Malaysia, Vietnam, Thailand, UAE, Ivory Coast, Mozambique, South Africa, Australia, United Kingdom, The Netherlands, France and Canada.

Tata Steel primarily serves customers in the automotive, construction, consumer goods, engineering, packaging, lifting and excavating, energy and power, aerospace, shipbuilding, rail and defence and security sectors.

Upcoming plans 
Tata Steel has set a target of achieving an annual production capacity of 100 million tons by 2015; it is planning for capacity expansion to be balanced roughly 50:50 between greenfield developments and acquisitions. Overseas acquisitions have already added an additional 21.4 million tonnes of capacity, including Corus (18.2 million tonnes), NatSteel (2 million tonnes) and Millennium Steel (1.2 million tonnes). Tata plans to add another 29 million tonnes of capacity through acquisitions.Major greenfield steel plant expansion projects planned by Tata Steel include:

 A 6 million tonne per annum capacity plant in Kalinganagar, Odisha, India;
 An expansion of the capacity of its plant in Jharkhand, India from 6.8 to 10 million tonnes per annum;
 A 5 million tonne per annum capacity plant in Chhattisgarh, India (Tata Steel signed a memorandum of understanding with the Chhattisgarh government in 2005; the plant is facing strong protest from tribal people);
 A 3 million tonne per annum capacity plant in Iran;
 A 2.4 million tonne per annum capacity plant in Bangladesh;
 A 10.5 million tonne per annum capacity plant in Vietnam (feasibility studies are underway); and
 A 6 million tonne per annum capacity plant in Haveri, Karnataka.
 Acquisition of Neelachal Ispat Nigam Ltd in Odisha, India

Issues with Europe business 
Since Tata Steel's Corus acquisition in 2007, Tata Steel's Europe unit faced issues from oversupply in the market, labor unions, inexpensive imports from Chinese steel makers, and pressure from regulators for decarbonisation (green taxes) which forced Tata Steel to consolidate its businesses in Europe.

In 2015, Tata Steel was looking to sell its facilities in Port Talbot, Hartlepool, Rotherham and Stocksbridge, which was put on hold due to Brexit. In April 2016, Tata Steel's Long Products Europe Division located in Scunthorpe, England was sold to Greybull Capital LLP. The unit was renamed as British Steel Limited.

In February 2017, the company decided to sell its specialty division to Liberty House Group.

In September 2017, ThyssenKrupp of Germany and Tata Steel announced plans to combine their European steel-making businesses. The deal will structure the European assets as Thyssenkrupp Tata Steel, an equal joint venture. The announcement estimated that the company would be Europe's second-largest steelmaker, and listed future headquarters in Amsterdam. However, in 2019, antitrust regulators of EU refused to accept deals citing reduction in competition. In 2019 Tata Steel decided to sell some of its non-core business units in UK.

In June 2020, the company requested £500 million in UK government support. Later in July media houses reported that the company has proposed to give away 50% of its stake in Port Talbot Steelworks to UK Government in return for capital injections amounting to £900 million.

In November 2020, SSAB of Sweden announced its intention to buy Tata Steel's unit in IJmuiden, Netherlands. However, in 2021, SSAB backed out of citing technical and cost issues involved with the deal.

In October 2021, Tata Steel Europe officially split its businesses into two independent entities Tata Steel Netherlands and Tata Steel UK.

In April 2022, Tata Steel announced that they had to find alternative sources of coal for their steel production plants in the UK and Netherlands after European nations stopped doing business with Russia because of its invasion of Ukraine.

Issues with South East Asia Business 
In January 2019, citing debt issues and consistent losses Tata Steel, decided to sell 70 per cent stake its S.E. Asia business (NatSteel and Tata Steel Thailand) to China's state-owned HBIS Group for $327 million. But the deal fell through citing regulatory issues.

Later in 2019, Tata Group signed a memorandum of understanding with the Private Equity firm, Synergy Metals and Mining Fund for divestment of 70% shareholding in Tata Steel (Thailand) Public Company Ltd. (excluding NatSteel)

In 2021, Tata Steel decided against divesting the South East Asian businesses citing improvement in financials, including reduction in total debt and increase in the cash flow. This was confirmed through its regulatory filing where Tata Steel reclassified its S.E. Asians assets from 'held for sale' to 'continuing operations'.

In Oct 2021, Tata Steel announced the sale of its subsidiary Natsteel Holdings Pte. Ltd to TopTip Holding Pte, a Singapore-based steel and iron ore trading company. The deal was valued at $172 million (₹1,275 crore). The deal included two Singapore facilities and one Malaysian facility excluding the wire business in Thailand.

Shareholding 
As on 31 March 2018, Tata Group held 31.64% shares in Tata Steel. Over 1 million individual shareholders hold approx. 21% of its shares. Life Insurance Corporation of India is the largest non-promoter shareholder in the company with 14.88% shareholding.

The equity shares of Tata Steel are listed on the Bombay Stock Exchange, where it is a constituent of the BSE SENSEX index, and the National Stock Exchange of India, where it is a constituent of the S&P CNX Nifty, the Global Depository Receipts (GDRs) are listed on the London Stock Exchange and the Luxembourg Stock Exchange.

Tata Steel Thailand 
Tata Steel's subsidiary Tata Steel (Thailand) Public Company Limited, (formerly Millennium Steel Public Company Limited) is listed on the Stock Exchange of Thailand. Tata Steel Limited directly holds 67.90% through its investment arm T S Global Holdings Pte. Ltd.

Carbon footprint 
Tata Steel Group reported Total CO2e emissions (Direct + Indirect) for 31 March 2021 at 25,790 Kt (-1,820 /-6.6% y-o-y). There is little evidence of a consistent declining trend as yet.

Controversies 
 Environment protection at Dhamra Port: The Dhamra Port, a joint venture between Larsen & Toubro and Tata Steel near Dhamra river in Bhadrak district of Odisha, has come in for criticism from groups such as Greenpeace, Wildlife Protection Society of India and the Orissa Traditional Fishworkers' Union for environment protection. The port is being built within five kilometers of the Bhitarkanika National Park, a Ramsar wetland of international importance, home to an impressive diversity of mangrove species, saltwater crocodiles and an array of avian species. The port will also be approximately 15 km. from the turtle nesting of Gahirmatha Beach, and turtles are also found immediately adjoining the port site. Aside from potential impacts on nesting and feeding grounds of the turtles, the mudflats of the port site itself are breeding grounds for horseshoe crabs as well as rare species of reptiles and amphibians. The port began commercial production in May 2011. In response, the company website informs that it has been working with International Union for Conservation of Nature (IUCN) for guidance and assistance in the implementation of environmental standards and designing mitigation measures for potential hazards during construction and operation of the Port.
 Job cuts in Europe: In 2019 citing surplus capacity and high costs the company announced plans to cut 3,000 jobs in Europe, including UK (Port Talbot Steelworks), Netherlands and other units. The decision was made after the failed attempt to consolidate with German Steelmaker Thyssenkrupp.

See also 

 List of steel producers
 List of companies of India
 List of largest companies by revenue
 List of corporations by market capitalization
 Make in India
 Forbes Global 2000
 Fortune India 500
 Tata Group
 Russi Mody

References

External links 

 

 
BSE SENSEX
Coal companies of India
Companies based in Jharkhand
Companies based in Kolkata
Companies based in Maharashtra
Companies listed on the Bombay Stock Exchange
Companies listed on the National Stock Exchange of India
Economy of Jharkhand
Indian companies established in 1907
Manufacturing companies established in 1907
NIFTY 50
Recipients of the Rashtriya Khel Protsahan Puruskar
Steel companies of India